Charles Wesley Godwin is an American country-folk musician from West Virginia.

Early life 
Godwin was born in Morgantown, West Virginia.

Musical career 
Godwin began playing music while studying finance at West Virginia University, where he first learned to play the guitar and practiced songwriting. He describes his musical style as inspired by, "...artists such as Kris Kristofferson, Willie Nelson, John Prine, Chris Knight and Ryan Bingham". His first album, Seneca was released in February 2019, and was met with positive reviews, being described by Saving Country Music as, "...a love letter to West Virginia and the bloodlines from whence he came, and that sense of everlasting love and appreciation is something everyone can relate to, regardless of the setting of their own personal stories."

He released his second project, How the Mighty Fall, was released in 2021, and also was received positively, being described as less autobiographical, and more focused on telling other people's stories, compared to his previous record.

Godwin has toured with Zach Bryan, whom he collaborated with on Bryan's song Jamie, on Bryan's 2022 EP, Summertime Blues.

References 



American country musicians
Country musicians from West Virginia
West Virginia University alumni
People from Morgantown, West Virginia